Glazunovsky (masculine), Glazunovskaya (feminine), or Glazunovskoye (neuter) may refer to:
Glazunovsky District, a district of Oryol Oblast, Russia
Glazunovsky (rural locality) (Glazunovskaya, Glazunovskoye), name of several rural localities in Russia